Maria Murano, the stage name of Suzanne Chauvelot (July 4, 1918 in Nogent-sur-Marne – January 10, 2009 in Limoges) was a French lyric mezzo-soprano.  She was most active postwar in the years between 1950 and 1970.

Career 
She started at the Paris Opera shortly after the end of World War II, then joined the Grand Théâtre of Bordeaux, where she became famous as Madame Alexandra in Jean-Michel Damase and Jean Anouilh's lyrical comedy Colombe in 1961.

Later, she played opposite Luis Mariano in Le Prince de Madrid, and Ivan Rebroff in Fiddler on the Roof.

Private life 
Her partner was politician Roland Dumas.

Honors 

 First Prize, Opera from the conservatoire
 Second Prize, Opera-Comique from the conservatoire

Selected roles 
The Duchess in Jacques Offenbach's La Grande-Duchesse de Gerolstein in 1956
Madame de Quimper-Karadec in Jacques Offenbach's La Vie parisienne
La Périchole in Jacques Offenbach's La Périchole
Moineau in Louis Beydts' Operetta Moineau
Madame Alexandra (Julien's mother) in Jean-Michel Damase' Colombe in 1961
La Duchesse d'Albe in Francis Lopez's Le Prince de Madrid
Golde (milkman Tevye's wife) in Sholem Aleichem's Fiddler on the Roof in 1969 at the Théâtre Marigny
Alice in Eugène Ionesco's The Picture at the Théâtre Silvia-Monfort in 1975

References

Sources 
 Annonce du décès sur le Populaire.fr

1918 births
2009 deaths
People from Nogent-sur-Marne
Operatic mezzo-sopranos
20th-century French women opera singers